FMB may refer to:

 Falcon Marching Band, of Bowling Green State University
 Famous Maroon Band, of Mississippi State University
 Federación Mexicana de Baloncesto, a basketball federation in Mexico
 Federation of Master Builders, in the United Kingdom
 First Merchant Bank, a Malawi bank
 Flavored malt beverage
 "Foggy Mountain Breakdown", a 1949 bluegrass song
 Fort Myers Beach, a town in Florida, United States
 Funky Monkey Babys, a Japanese band

See also
 Farmers and Merchants Bank (disambiguation)